{{DISPLAYTITLE:C29H46O3}}
The molecular formula C29H46O3 (molar mass: 442.674 g/mol, exact mass: 442.3447 u) may refer to:

 Nandrolone undecanoate
 Testosterone decanoate

Molecular formulas